The 1937 Pacific Southwest Championships was a combined men's and women's amateur tennis tournament played on outdoor hard courts at the Los Angeles Tennis Club in Los Angeles, California in the United States. It was the 12th edition of the tournament and took place from September 19 through September 26, 1937. Don Budge and Alice Marble won the singles titles.

Finals

Men's singles
 Don Budge defeated  Gottfried von Cramm 2–6, 7–5, 6–4, 7–5

Women's singles
 Alice Marble defeated  Gracyn Wheeler 7–5, 2–6, 6–4

Men's doubles
 Charles Hare /  Pat Hughes defeated  Frank Shields /  Jacques Brugnon 6–4, 6–4, 6–2

Women's doubles
 Dorothy Bundy /  Dorothy Workman defeated  Carolin Babcock /  Marjorie Gladman Von Ryn 6–1, 0–6, 6–2

Mixed doubles
 Helen Moody /  Gottfried von Cramm defeated  Marjorie Gladman Von Ryn /  Don Budge 6–1, 6–4

References

Los Angeles Open (tennis)
Pacific Southwest Championships
Pacific Southwest Championships